Spodnje Jelenje (in older sources also Dolenje Jelenje) is a small settlement northwest of Dole pri Litiji in the Municipality of Litija in central Slovenia. The area is part of the traditional region of Lower Carniola and is now included with the rest of the municipality in the Central Sava Statistical Region.

References

External links
Spodnje Jelenje on Geopedia

Populated places in the Municipality of Litija